Barry G. Nelson is an American former center who played in the National Basketball Association. Nelson was drafted by the Milwaukee Bucks in the fifth round of the 1971 NBA Draft and spent the 1971-72 season with the team.

He attended high school in Fox Chapel, Pennsylvania.

References

1949 births
Living people
American men's basketball players
Centers (basketball)
Duquesne Dukes men's basketball players
Milwaukee Bucks draft picks
Milwaukee Bucks players
People from Fox Chapel, Pennsylvania